Flora Wambaugh Patterson (1847–1928) was an American mycologist, and the first female plant pathologist hired by the United States Department of Agriculture. She ran the US National Fungus Collections for almost thirty years, radically growing the collection and shaping its direction, and supervised or discovered numerous significant fungal diseases.

Life  
Flora Wambaugh was born in Columbus, Ohio, to Sarah Sells (Wambaugh) and Methodist minister A. B. Wambaugh. She studied fungi as a hobby in her childhood. 
She attended Antioch College in Ohio, earning her bachelor's degree in 1865.  
She then earned two Master's degrees from Cincinnati Wesleyan College.  Wambaugh married Captain Edwin Patterson in 1869, assuming his name, and they had two children; she worked to support the family financially.  
After his death Patterson continued her studies at the State University of Iowa, and in 1892 or 1893 made plans to transfer to Yale University. When Yale rejected her because she was a woman, she moved to Cambridge, Massachusetts, and began studies at Radcliffe College, where she worked at the Gray Herbarium at Harvard.

In 1895, Patterson joined the USDA as a pathologist, hired by Beverly T. Galloway along with Franklin Sumner Earle.  
During her almost thirty-year tenure at the USDA, Patterson increased the size of the U.S. National Fungus Collections by almost six times, from 19,000 to 115,000 reference specimens.  She identified numerous new species of fungus, including those causing pineapple rot (Thielaviopsis paradoxa), peach leaf curl (Taphrina), and "witches' broom" on bamboo (Loculistroma bambusae), which was an entirely new genus.

Among other responsibilities, Patterson was in charge of identifying new fungal pathogens, and took a leading role in identifying the chestnut blight that wiped out eastern North America's chestnut forests, and the potato wart disease Synchytrium endobioticum.  
Patterson was involved in Japan's gift to the United States of cherry trees, ultimately leading to the destruction of the first shipment of trees which was infected with multiple types of insects and diseases. 
All of these incidents led to the passage of the Plant Quarantine Act of 1912 which aimed to prevent introduction of invasive harmful diseases.
 
Patterson continued her work with the USDA until retiring at the age of 75, and then lived with one of her sons in New York City until her death at the age of 80.

Selected bibliography of Patterson's writings 
 Patterson, F. W. 1894. Species of Taphrina parasitic on Populus. Proc. Amer. Assoc. Advan. Sci. 43:293-294.
 Patterson, F. W. 1895. A study of North American parasitic Exoascaceae. Iowa Univ. Bull. Lab. Nat. Hist. 3:89-135.
 Patterson, F. W., Charles, V. K., and Veihmeyer, F. J. 1910. Some fungous diseases of economic importance. I.-Miscellaneous Diseases. II. Pineapple rot caused by Thielaviopsis paradoxa. USDA, Bureau of Plant Industry, Bull. No. 171.
 Patterson, F. W., and Charles, V. K. 1915. Mushrooms and other common fungi. USDA Bulletin No. 175.
 Patterson, F. W., and Charles, V. K. 1917. Some common edible and poisonous mushrooms. USDA Farmer’s Bulletin No. 796

Notes

Further research 

 
 "Women's Who's Who of America" (1982)

1847 births
1928 deaths
Ohio Wesleyan Female College alumni
American mycologists
Women mycologists
United States Department of Agriculture officials
American phytopathologists
Women phytopathologists